Ivanovskaya is a rural locality (a village) in Lipetskoye Rural Settlement, Verkhovazhsky District, Vologda Oblast, Russia. The population was 30 as of 2002.

Geography 
The distance to Verkhovazhye is 71.7 km, to Leushinskaya is 4 km. Kamenka, Kostyuninskaya, Nikulinskaya are the nearest rural localities.

References 

Rural localities in Verkhovazhsky District